The Talmadge is a historic brick residential building in Los Angeles, California and which bears the name of silent film actress Norma Talmadge.

History
A house owned by Earle C. Anthony, built in 1909, was moved to Beverly Hills, California for the 1923 construction of this building. Upon its completion in 1924, it was owned by movie studio executive Joseph M. Schenck and his wife, silent actress Norma Talmadge, who was its namesake. It was designed in the  style by William and Alexander Curlett & Claud Beelman.

Initially, Schenck and Talmadge resided on the 10th floor. The rest of the tenants were socialites and heirs.

The interior lobby and main entrance of the building were used, briefly, at the beginning of the 1925 Buster Keaton silent comedy "Seven Chances."  Mr. Keaton was married to Natalie Talmadge, the sister of Ms. Talmadge.  Mr. Schenck was, at the time, producing Mr. Keaton's films.

References

Residential buildings completed in 1924
Residential buildings in Los Angeles
Wilshire Boulevard
Koreatown, Los Angeles
Beaux-Arts architecture in California